The rex sole (Glyptocephalus zachirus) is a flatfish of the family Pleuronectidae. Locally, it may also be known as a witch or threadfin sole (due to the filamentous pelvic fin on the eyed surface). Its native habitat is the northern Pacific, from Baja California in Mexico up the coasts of the United States, British Columbia and Alaska, across the Bering Sea to the coast of Russia and the Sea of Japan. Maximum reported lifespan is 24 years.

Description

The rex sole is a right-eyed flounder with an elongate, oval-shaped body and a small mouth. Its upper surface is uniform in colour, light brown to grey, with small scales; its underside is off-white. The dorsal and ventral fins on the upper side are dark, and the pectoral fin is long and mostly black. The caudal fin is rounded. The lateral line is nearly straight.

Diet

The rex sole's diet consists of benthos invertebrates such as crustaceans, worms, shrimps and crabs.

Commercial fishing

The rex sole is fished commercially, and its flesh is considered tasty. Commercial fishing is conducted by trawler and the fish comprises a major part of the flatfish trawl fishery from California northward to the Bering Sea.

References

rex sole
Fish of the North Pacific
Western North American coastal fauna
Taxa named by William Neale Lockington

rex sole